The 2014 World University American Football Championship was an international college American football tournament that was held from May 1 to 11, 2014 in Uppsala, Sweden, at Österängens IP. It was the 1st World University Championship for American football. The tournament was held in round-robin format, with each team facing each other once.

Teams

Final standings

Matches
Game 1

Game 2

Game 3

Game 4

Game 5

Game 6

Game 7

Game 8

Game 9

Game 10

References
http://www.uppsala2014.com/se/results

World University American Football Championship
2014 in Swedish sport
IFAF
International sports competitions hosted by Sweden
American